Saint-Béat-Lez is a commune in the Haute-Garonne department in southwestern France. The municipality was established on January 1, 2019 and consist of the communes of Lez and Saint-Béat.

References

Communes of Haute-Garonne
2019 establishments in France
States and territories established in 2019